South Angus was a county constituency in Scotland, represented in the House of Commons of the Parliament of the United Kingdom from 1950 to 1983.

Boundaries
The burghs of Arbroath, Carnoustie, Forfar, Kirriemuir, and Monifieth, and the districts of Carnoustie, Forfar, Kirriemuir, and Monifieth.

Members of Parliament

Election results

Elections of the 1950s

Elections of the 1960s

Elections of the 1970s

References

Politics of Angus, Scotland
Historic parliamentary constituencies in Scotland (Westminster)
Constituencies of the Parliament of the United Kingdom established in 1950
Constituencies of the Parliament of the United Kingdom disestablished in 1983
1950 establishments in Scotland
1983 disestablishments in Scotland